Thomas Wills Antill (20 November 1830 – 11 May 1865) was an Australian cricketer who played for Victoria.

Biography
He was born at Jarvisfield, Picton, New South Wales in 1830. Antill made a single first-class appearance for the team, during the 1850–51 season, against Tasmania. He scored a duck in the first innings in which he batted, and 0 not out in the second.  Antill took match figures of 13–51 with the ball. Antill's cousin, Tom Wills, also played first-class cricket.

In 1861 or 1862, he moved from Geelong to Nelson, New Zealand, where he was manager of the branch of the Union Bank of Australia. In Nelson, he was active in church affairs. He died on 11 May 1865 after a brief illness, and his funeral procession was the largest that Nelson had ever witnessed thus far. He was buried at Wakapuaka Cemetery.

References

1830 births
1865 deaths
Australian cricketers
Victoria cricketers
Melbourne Cricket Club cricketers
Cricketers from New South Wales
Australian emigrants to New Zealand
Burials at Wakapuaka Cemetery
Cricketers from Nelson, New Zealand